First Mesa (Hopi: Wàlpi) is a census-designated place (CDP) in Navajo County, Arizona, United States, on the Hopi Reservation.  As of the 2010 census, the CDP population was 1,555, spread among three Hopi villages atop the 5,700-foot (1,740 m) mesa: Hano (or Tegua, Arizona), Sitsomovi (or Sichomovi), and Waalpi (or Walpi).

Geography

First Mesa is located at  (35.834948, -110.378331).

Demographics

As of the census of 2000, there were 1,124 people, 294 households, and 251 families residing in the CDP. The racial makeup of the CDP was 96.1% Native American, 2.9% White, no Black/African American, Asian, or Pacific Islander, 0.2% from other races, and 0.9% from two or more races. 2.5% of the population were Hispanic or Latino of any race.

There were 294 households, out of which 43.5% had children under the age of 18 living with them, 46.6% were married couples living together, 32.3% had a female householder with no husband present, and 14.6% were non-families. 11.6% of all households were made up of individuals, and 2.7% had someone living alone who was 65 years of age or older.  The average household size was 3.82 and the average family size was 4.10.

In the CDP, the population was spread out, with 38.3% under the age of 18, 9.1% from 18 to 24, 25.3% from 25 to 44, 19.4% from 45 to 64, and 7.9% who were 65 years of age or older.  The median age was 28 years. For every 100 females, there were 90.2 males.  For every 100 females age 18 and over, there were 89.9 males.

The median income for a household in the CDP was $19,605, and the median income for a family was $21,346. Males had a median income of $37,000 versus $21,458 for females. The per capita income for the CDP was $7,897.  About 36.5% of families and 45.2% of the population were below the poverty line, including 45.5% of those under age 18 and 21.4% of those age 65 or over.

Education 
First Mesa is served by the Cedar Unified School District.

Hopi High School serves First Mesa.

References

Mesas of Arizona
Census-designated places in Navajo County, Arizona
Hopi
Hopi Reservation